Marlon Kittel (born December 11, 1983 in Essen) is a German actor.

Life and work 
Marlon Kittel started working for the film industry as a stuntman for the German TV series Der Clown before he was discovered as an actor. Since 1999, he has had roles in more than a dozen movies and has made a number of appearances on German TV series, such as The Old Fox and Polizeiruf 110. His popularity increased when the 2004 movie Summer Storm came to the cinemas. Marlon played a gay character named Leo. It was the second time he had appeared in a movie with Robert Stadlober (after Play It Loud!, 2003). It was also the second time playing a gay character. His first appearance in such a role was in the short movie Freunde (The Whiz Kids, 2000). Kittel has also had roles in over 20 German television movies and shows between 2006–2013, and has been a voice actor in several audio dramas.

Personal 
Besides acting, Kittel plays the piano, saxophone and drums. He speaks English fluently and also has some Spanish and French abilities. He has basic knowledge of how to dance the Flamenco. He also exercises and plays ice hockey, fencing, apparatus gymnastics, handball, inline skating, karate, kick boxing, rock climbing, parkour, paddling, sailing, skiing, snowboarding, tennis, and wind surfing. In an interview in 2010, he stated that he prefers to work instead of getting welfare.

Filmography

Short films

Films

Television Movies

*He was in this segment of the movie.

Television series

Audio Dramas

Awards

References

External links

Vita (agency)
Crew-United Profile
Interview at moviesection.de (2009)

1983 births
Living people
Actors from Essen
German male film actors
German male television actors